Armitage is a village in Staffordshire, England.

Armitage may also refer to:

Places
 Cape Armitage on Ross Island, Antarctica
 Armitage, a community that is now part of Newmarket, Ontario, Canada
 Armitage River, a tributary of Chibougamau Lake in Quebec, Canada
 Armitage (Schriever, Louisiana)
 Armitage Avenue (Chicago), an east–west arterial street in Chicago, Illinois, United States
 Armitage (CTA), a train station in Chicago serving Armitage Avenue
 Armitage with Handsacre, a civil parish in Staffordshire, England

Other uses
 Armitage III, an anime film series
 Armitage, an eponymous comic series featuring Detective-Judge Armitage
 Armitage (surname), includes a list of people and characters
 Armitage (comics), a science fiction series in the British comic anthology the Judge Dredd Megazine
 Armitage (computing), a graphical cyber attack management tool for the Metasploit Project
 Armitage Manufacturing Company, a historic factory in Richmond, Virginia
 Armitage Robinson, a priest in the Church of England and scholar
 Armitage Hux, a First Order general in the Star Wars universe
 Armitage Trail, pen name of Maurice R. Coons, an American pulp fiction author

See also
Armitage–Doll multistage model of carcinogenesis
Armitage Shanks, manufacturers of bathroom furniture, which started there